Paul Burton Steinberg (born March 21, 1940) is an American attorney and former politician in the state of Florida.

Early life, education, & military service
Steinberg was born in Brooklyn, New York. He came to Florida in 1957. He graduated from the University of Miami (BBA, 1961) and from Stetson School of Law (JD, 1963). He was an editor of the business school newspaper and served on the debate team. He served in the United States Coast Guard from 1963 to 1971. He served on active duty in 1963 and was in the reserves from 1964 to 1971. He reached the rank of Petty officer third class.

Political career
He is the former chairman of the Miami Beach Beautification Committee. He served in the Florida House of Representatives from 1972 to 1978, as a Democrat, representing the 101st district. He served in the Florida Senate from 1978 to 1982 representing the 36th district.

From 1981 to 1982 he served as chairman of the Florida Motion Picture & T.V. Council.

Legal career
He has practiced law with Steinberg & Associates since the firm's founding in 1969.

Personal life
He and his wife Sandra have three children. He and his son Richard work at the same law firm.

References

1940 births
Living people
Democratic Party members of the Florida House of Representatives
United States Coast Guard non-commissioned officers
Democratic Party Florida state senators
People from Brooklyn
People from Miami Beach, Florida
University of Miami Business School alumni
21st-century American lawyers
20th-century American lawyers
20th-century American politicians
Florida lawyers
Stetson University College of Law alumni